Viettel Football Club, simply known as Viettel FC, is a Vietnamese professional football club based in Hanoi. The club belongs to the Viettel Sports Centre, a part of Viettel Group and competes in the V.League 1, the top tier of the Vietnamese football league system.

Viettel, formerly known as Thể Công, is one of the most widely supported clubs and also the most successful club in Vietnamese football history, having won a record 19 national titles, including nine consecutively from 1971 to 1979. The club has also contributed many great players to the national team.

Viettel's traditional colour is red, leading to the nickname Cơn lốc đỏ (Red Tornado). As Thể Công, they held a long-standing rivalry with Công an Hà Nội (a club run by the Hanoi Police, not to be confused with recently rebranded Công an Hà Nội), known as the "Hanoi Derby" or the "Vietnamese Clasico", from the mid-1950s to their dissolution in 2002. Nowadays, the derby is contested between Viettel and Hanoi FC.

History

Thể Công period

1954-1968: Formation and rising
On September 23, 1954, according to the appointment of the Director of the General Department of Politics at that time, General Nguyen Chi Thanh, đoàn công tác Thể dục Thể thao Quân đội (Thể Công) was established. Thể Công is short for Thể dục Thể thao Công tác Đội and was managed by Ministry of Defence.

The first Thể Công team include 23 people of the cadre from The Army Officer College No1 and was divided into three teams: 11 football, 5 basketball and 6 volleyball players. In addition, all three teams also have a special reserve player, Ly Duc Kim, who knows how to play football, both basketball and volleyball, and has the ability to be a nurse and good logistics. Kim also has the above support functions.

The first main lineup of The Cong football team include: 
Lê Nhâm; Nguyễn Văn Hiếu; Phạm Ngọc Quế; Nguyễn Thiêm; Ngô Xuân Quýnh; Phạm Mạnh Soạn; Trương Vinh Thăng; Nguyễn Bá Khánh; Nguyễn Văn Bưởi (capital); Nguyễn Thông (player-coach); Vũ Tâm (as Phạm Vinh). 
Beside, Nguyen Van Thanh (as Tí Bồ) was joined later, was a famous player of the first Vietnamese footballers generation in the 1930s to 1950s period.

More than a month later, on October 25, in the first football match held since the liberation of Hanoi capital at Hang Day Stadium, The Cong had the first match in its history against Tran Hung Dao University team, including players from the capital's working class. The team won with a score of 1 - 0 with the only goal of the match being scored in the 30th second by the striker captain Nguyen Van Buoi.

In 1955, Vietnam's first football tournament was held in Hai Phong with the name Hoà Bình League (precursor of V.League 1), Thể Công was participated with two teams A and B. Both teams won championships of two A and B classes.

In 1956, for the first time, the Democratic Republic of Vietnam national football team was convened for international duty. At the age of 38, Ti Bo was still called to the national team along with nine other The Cong players to participate in his first tour in China. He became one of the first players of the Vietnamese team and the oldest Vietnamese national player ever.

During the following years, Thể Công won the champions in 1956 and 1958. At that time, Công An Hải Phòng and Công An Hà Nội has been their main and traditional rival in Northern Vietnam football. Three clubs played are also the founding members in the highest Vietnamese system league in the mid-1950s and became the Big 3 clubs in the early Vietnam football period. In 1950s and 1960s, Công An Hải Phòng was far more successful, winning ten championships, including four consecutively from 1965 to 1968, making the club became North Vietnam's record champion. Thể Công took over the title more than six years later in 1976, when they won their tenth championship in 1970 and also their last nation league trophy. The duel between Thể Công and Công An Hải Phòng was referred to as the Northern Derby, but the Hanoi Derby with Công An Hà Nội was more attention because they are always counter the Red Tornado by good defense system, who reached the champions twice in 1962 and 1964.

1969-2000: Golden decade: Dominance in the league

Since the 1969s to 1979s, The Cong had always dominated in national league with 10 championships in Vietnam's A Class National League, including nine consecutively from 1971 to 1979. During that time, the typical generation of The Cong players were Nguyễn Thế Anh (Ba Den), Nguyễn Cao Cường, Quan Trong Hung, Vương Tiến Dũng, Nguyễn Trọng Giáp, Vu Manh Hai,... with the majority being young players who went to long-term training in North Korea in 1967 and when they returned home, they were the most outstanding and typical players in the country.

After the country was unified and had the National Championship (the predecessor of the V-League), The Cong has always been the strongest football club in Vietnam with 5 championships. The Cong players have always been the core of the national team and contributed many players in the golden generation of Vietnamese football such as goalkeeper Tran Tien Anh, Do Manh Dung, Nguyen Manh Cuong, and Nguyen Hong Son, Truong Viet Hoang, Nguyen Duc Thang, Pham Nhu Thuan, Trieu Quang Ha, Dang Phuong Nam, Vu Cong Tuyen... The Cong was the longest standing team in the V-League until the team was relegated in 2004. (In 1979, The Cong did not participate in the tournament).

At that times, Công An Hà Nội was still a main rivals have been the clubs who put up the strongest fight against its national dominance. Matches with CAHN was more than a local derby with many classic wins, draws and losses. Due to Thể Công being traditionally hard to beat for CAHN though they had no any trophies for a long times.

2004-2008: Relegation and promoted back
In 2004, exactly 50 years after its foundation, Thể Công football club finished V-League at 11th place (out of 12) and was relegated to the lower division. 
The team performed poorly partly due to the policy of not recruiting foreign soldiers, in contrast to all other teams at that time. In the following season, the club changed its name to The Cong Viettel (Viettel is the Army Electronics and Telecommunication Corporation) and is partially managed by this unit. However, many comments suggested that the club should return to its old name.

On January 19, 2007, the club finally gained the right to be promoted back to V-League after winning over Tay Ninh 5–3. Immediately thereafter, the official team name was reversed back to Thể Công.

2009-2010: The end and transfer
On September 22, 2009 (before the 55th anniversary of the establishment of Thể Công) the Ministry of Defense decided to change Thể Công to Viettel.
In November 2009, the Ministry of Defence decided to remove name "Thể Công" out of football in Vietnam, and transfer all management of football club to Viettel.

On September 23, 2011 on the occasion of the 57th anniversary of the establishment of the club, hundreds of officials, players, and fans of all generations who were once members of The Cong decided to launch a "campaign" to collect 1 million signatures across the country to petition the Ministry of Defense to regain the title Thể Công. However, Viettel Telecom Corporation is not very interested in this reception.

Facing the risk of being dissolved, the acting director of the Center at that time, Nguyen Thanh Hai, asked the leaders of Viettel Telecom Corporation to allow the maintenance of the Viettel Football Center and pledged to bring results in a year. In the 2010 football season, the Center's teams reached the final round of the youth tournaments. In 2011, the Center won 1 Gold, 1 Silver and 1 Bronze Medal in youth tournaments, officially gaining the right to exist. In the 2012 football season, the official squad of Viettel Football Center won the championship with the same rank at the Vietnam Third Division Football Championship and won a place in the Second Division since the 2013 season.

Modern era

Viettel period

2010–2018: Promotion

Next to 2010 season, the club again switched its name back to Viettel FC, and also voluntarily left the professional football set-up. Instead, the club decided to focus on youth development, and start competing again in the amateur 4th tier of Vietnamese football.

On October 26, 2014, the General Director of Military Telecommunications Group signed the decision No. 2294/QD-VTQ-TCNL to consolidate the functions and tasks and change the name of Viettel Football Training Center to Viettel Sports Center.

In 2016, the club finally returned to professional football after winning promotion to the V.League 2.

In 2018, Viettel F.C. won the V.League 2 championship and went back to the national top tier V.League 1. The football club also wanted to switch back to the formerly name Thể Công when the tournament started from 2019, but was not agreed yet from the Ministry of Defence, who owned brands name "Thể Công" and were used by their volleyball team – "Câu lạc bộ bóng chuyền Thể Công" (Thể Công Volleyball Club). Therefore, the official name of the football club is Câu lạc bộ Bóng đá Viettel (Viettel Football Club) and owned by Viettel Group.

2019–present: Revival
In the 2020 season, Viettel had a race to the championship with Hanoi.
In the 2020 National Cup, the club won the runner-up title after losing 1–2 at Hang Day Stadium against Hanoi.
At LS 2020 V.League 1, the club won the championship after beating Saigon FC 1–0 with Bruno Cantanhede's only goal in the last round – round 7 of phase 2 of group A taking place on 8/08. 11/2020. They only took two seasons in V.League 1 to be crowned, when they were promoted from the 2019 season. If including the achievements of Thể Công, this is the 19th time they has won the championship.
In 2021, the club qualified for the AFC Champions League.

Continental record

Season-by-season record (V-League)

Honours

National competitions
League
V.League 1/ A1 National League
 Winners (6; record): 1981–82, 1982–83, 1987, 1990, 1998, 2020
 Runners-up : (4) 1984, 1989, 1986, 1992
 Third place : (3) 1993–94, 1997, 2000–01

Hoa Binh League
 Winners (13; record): 1955, 1956, 1958, 1969, 1971, 1972, 1973, 1974, 1975, 1976, 1977, 1978, 1979
V.League 2:
 Winners : (2) 2007, 2018
 Runners-up : (1) 2016 (as Viettel F.C.)
Second League:   (as Viettel F.C.)
 Winners :      2015
 Runners-up : 2009
Third League   (as Viettel F.C.) 
 Winners : 2008
Cup
Vietnamese Cup:
 Runners-up : (4) 1992, 2004, 2009 , 2020.

Vietnamese Super Cup:
 Winners : (1) 1999.
 Runners-up : (1) 2020

Other competitions
Festival Sport Vietnam
 Winners : 2002
Army ASEAN (1)
 Winners : 2004
 Runners-up : 1999
U21 (2)
 Winners : 1997, 1998
U19 (3)
 Winners : 1998, 2002, 2009
SKDA
 Third place : (1) 1989

Players

First-team squad

Out on loan

Reserves and academy

Out on loan

Results and fixtures

Kit suppliers and shirt sponsors

Famous players

Coaching staff

Coaches
  Quản Trọng Hùng (2001–?)
  Branko Radović (?–7/11/2003)
  Phan Văn Mỵ (7/11/2003-?)
  Tomas Viczko (10/2006-?)
  Gyorgy Galhidi (31/7/2007–1/9/2008)
  Vương Tiến Dũng (16/9/2008–2009)
  Lê Thụy Hải (1/2009–5/2009)
  Đinh Thế Nam (2016)
  Nguyễn Hải Biên (2017–1/2019)
  Lee Heung-sil (1/2019-6/2019)
  Nguyễn Hải Biên (6/2019–)
  Trương Việt Hoàng (1/2020–)
  Hans-Jürgen Gede (6/2021) (2021 AFC Champions League only)
  Bae Ji-won (6/2022) (2022 AFC Cup only)

References

External links
 Old forum about The Cong
 The Cong 2009 squad

Viettel FC
Viettel Football Club
Football clubs in Hanoi
Association football clubs established in 1954
1954 establishments in Vietnam
Military association football clubs in Vietnam